Violagonum is a genus of beetles in the family Carabidae, containing the following species:

 Violagonum dentiferum Darlington, 1970
 Violagonum piceum (Andrewes, 1927)
 Violagonum violaceum (Chaudoir, 1859)

References

Platyninae